Esclangon is a lunar impact crater that is located in the rugged terrain to the northwest of the prominent crater Macrobius, and east of Sinus Amoris. Its diameter is 15 km. It was named after French astronomer Ernest Esclangon. This formation was previously designated Macrobius L. Just to the west-southwest is the crater Hill. Lacus Bonitatis, the Lake of Good, is located to the east and northeast of Esclangon.

The interior of this crater has been flooded, leaving only a low rim above the surface being only about 400 meters deep. The rim is not quite circular, having bulges to the northeast and northwest, most likely the result of smaller craters that have merged with the main rim. The interior surface is level and nearly featureless.

References

External links

 LTO-43C1 Hill — L&PI topographic map

Impact craters on the Moon